Brett Philip Gallant (born February 18, 1990 in Charlottetown, Prince Edward Island) is a Canadian curler from Calgary. He currently plays second for the Brendan Bottcher rink.

Career

Juniors
Gallant has represented Prince Edward Island in the Canadian Junior Curling Championships numerous times, winning the 2009 Canadian Junior Curling Championships on his fourth attempt. Gallant won five straight provincial titles in P.E.I. from 2006 to 2010. He holds the record for most all-time wins at the Canadian Juniors (48), which he set after his second win at the 2010 Canadian Junior Curling Championships.

At the 2009 World Junior Curling Championships, Gallant represented Team Canada, and after placing first after the round-robin, lost in the final to Denmark's Rasmus Stjerne rink.

Gallant also won a bronze medal for P.E.I. at the 2007 Canada Games.

Men's
Gallant joined Brad Gushue's team during the 2012–13 season as the team's third and moved to Newfoundland and Labrador in the process. The team would win the 2013 Newfoundland and Labrador Tankard, sending them to the 2013 Tim Hortons Brier, Gallant's first. The team would make the playoffs with an 8–3 record. They would lose the 3 vs. 4 game to Northern Ontario's Brad Jacobs and the bronze medal game to Ontario's Glenn Howard. The Gushue rink failed to make the playoffs at the 2014 Tim Hortons Brier after going 6–5 in the round-robin. Mark Nichols rejoined the team for the following season, and Gallant moved to second on the team. They would improve on their best finish at the 2015 Tim Hortons Brier, where they lost in the semifinal to Team Canada, skipped by Pat Simmons. During the 2014–15 season, Gallant would also win his first Grand Slam of Curling event, the 2014 Masters and the 2014 Canadian Open.

The Gushue rink would win three more slams during the 2015–16 season, the 2015 National, the 2016 Elite 10 and the 2016 Players' Championship. With their successful tour season, the team entered the 2016 Tim Hortons Brier as the number one seed. They led Newfoundland and Labrador to a 9–2 round-robin record, earning them a spot in the 1 vs. 2 game. They would defeat Northern Ontario's Jacobs before losing to Alberta's Kevin Koe 9–5 in the final. The team finished second on the CTRS standings for the season, just behind the Koe rink.

Team Gushue added one more slam title during the 2016–17 season at the 2017 Canadian Open. The team would also have their most successful Brier to date at the 2017 Tim Hortons Brier, which was hosted in St. John's. They once again finished 9–2 in the round-robin and would win the 1 vs. 2 game over Manitoba's Mike McEwen rink. Tied 6–6 in the final end of the final against Koe, Gushue needed to draw a full eight-foot to win the title. The team swept it all the way down the sheet, and the stone was just close enough for the win. It was Newfoundland's first Brier title since 1976. The team represented Canada at the 2017 World Men's Curling Championship, where they went undefeated en route to capturing the gold medal. The whole Canadian team was named the All-Star Team for the tournament. This would earn them first place on the CTRS standings for the season.

The team followed this successful season up with another great season for the 2017–18 season. It did come with a bit of heartbreak, though, as the team lost the semifinal of the 2017 Canadian Olympic Curling Trials. They shook this off, though, able to win three more slams, the 2017 Tour Challenge, the 2017 Masters, and the 2018 Humpty's Champions Cup. His rink would defend their title at the 2018 Tim Hortons Brier. Representing Team Canada, they went 10–1 through the round-robin and championship pool and defeated Alberta's Brendan Bottcher 6–4 in the final. They would lose the final of the 2018 World Men's Curling Championship to Sweden's Niklas Edin team.

The team added a tenth slam title to their name at the 2018 Elite 10 (September) the following season. They would lose the 3 vs. 4 game of the 2019 Tim Hortons Brier to Bottcher's rink. On the tour, they lost in the finals of the 2018 China Open to Russia's Sergey Glukhov and the Stu Sells 1824 Halifax Classic to Scott Howard who was skipping the Glenn Howard team. They began their 2019–20 season at the 2019 AMJ Campbell Shorty Jenkins Classic, where they lost to eventual champions John Epping in the quarterfinals. They then lost in the semifinal of the Stu Sells Toronto Tankard to Brad Jacobs, who also went on to win the event. In Grand Slam play, the team didn't win any events but finished runner-up at both the 2019 Masters and the 2019 Tour Challenge and lost in the semifinals of the 2019 National and the 2020 Canadian Open. The team would win the 2020 Newfoundland and Labrador Tankard after not having to play in it for the previous two seasons. At the 2020 Tim Hortons Brier, the team finished 8–3, which qualified them for the 3 vs. 4 game. They would beat Brad Jacobs in the 3 vs. 4, Saskatchewan's Matt Dunstone in the semifinal, and Alberta's Bottcher rink in the final to win their third Brier title. The team was set to represent Canada once again at the 2020 World Men's Curling Championship before the event got cancelled due to the COVID-19 pandemic. The Brier would be their last event of the season as both the Players' Championship and the Champions Cup Grand Slam events were also cancelled due to the pandemic.

Team Gushue played in two events during the 2020–21 season, the Dave Jones Mayflower Cashspiel and the Stu Sells 1824 Halifax Classic, winning both. Representing Team Canada at the 2021 Tim Hortons Brier, they finished with an 8–4 record, not advancing to the playoffs for the first time since 2014.

2022 Winter Olympics
Gallant's team, skipped by Brad Gushue, qualified as the Canadian representatives for the 2022 Winter Olympics by winning the 2021 Canadian Olympic Curling Trials, defeating Brad Jacobs 4–3 in the final. The team won the bronze medal.

Mixed doubles
In April 2016, Gallant and teammate Jocelyn Peterman won the 2016 Canadian Mixed Doubles Curling Trials after battling to a 12–8 win over Laura Crocker and Geoff Walker at the Nutana Curling Club in Saskatoon, Sask. The new champions were playing in their first Mixed Doubles event together. The pair played in the 2018 Canadian Mixed Doubles Curling Olympic Trials, going undefeated in group play, but lost to the eventual champion John Morris / Kaitlyn Lawes pairing in the semifinal. Peterman and Gallant also won the 2019 Canadian Mixed Doubles Curling Championship, defeating Nancy Martin and Tyrel Griffith in the final. The pair represented Canada at the 2019 World Mixed Doubles Curling Championship, where they won the silver medal after losing 6–5 to Sweden's Anna Hasselborg and Oskar Eriksson on the last rock.

On March 2, 2022, Curling Canada announced that Peterman and Gallant would represent Canada at the 2022 World Mixed Doubles Curling Championship after the Canadian Mixed Doubles Championship was cancelled due to COVID. At the championship, the pair finished second in their pool with an 8–1 record, only suffering one loss to Scotland's Eve Muirhead and Bobby Lammie. This earned them a spot in the qualification game against Norway's Maia and Magnus Ramsfjell. After a tight game all the way through, Norway scored two in the final end to win the game 6–5, eliminating the Canadians in fifth place.

On the World Curling Tour, Gallant and Peterman have won the 2018 Battleford Mixed Doubles Fall Curling Classic and the 2019 China Open.

Personal life
His parents are Kathie Gallant and Peter Gallant, Canadian former Mixed champions. Gallant began curling at age 4. He attended Memorial University in St. John's. He and his mixed doubles partner, Jocelyn Peterman, married on June 4, 2022. He graduated from the University of Prince Edward Island in 2018 with a Bachelor's Degree in Business Administration.

Awards
Brier: First Team All-Star, Second - 2018 and 2023
Brier: Second Team All-Star, Second - 2019 and 2021
World Men's Curling Championship: All-Star Second - 2017
Gallant was named Senior Male Athlete of the Year and was awarded the Lieutenant Governor's Award (presented to the top overall Island athlete) at the 2016 Sport PEI Amateur Sport Awards.

References

External links

2007 Canada Games profile

1990 births
Living people
Canadian male curlers
Curlers from Prince Edward Island
Curlers from Newfoundland and Labrador
Gallant, Brent
Sportspeople from St. John's, Newfoundland and Labrador
Brier champions
World curling champions
Canadian mixed doubles curling champions
Continental Cup of Curling participants
Canada Cup (curling) participants
Olympic curlers of Canada
Curlers at the 2022 Winter Olympics
Medalists at the 2022 Winter Olympics
Olympic medalists in curling
Olympic bronze medalists for Canada
University of Prince Edward Island alumni
Curlers from Calgary